Mebisa, formerly called Chukha or Chhukha, is a town on the Wangchu River and seat of the Chukha District in Bhutan. In 2005, it had a population of 2,855 (2005 census).

References

External links

Satellite map at Maplandia.com

Populated places in Bhutan